The Whitefish River is a short river in Kenora District in northwestern Ontario, Canada, and is in the Hudson Bay and Nelson River drainage basins.

Course
The river begins at an unnamed lake and flows southwest then southeast and takes in the right tributary Mold Creek arriving from Mold Lake. It then heads east and reaches its mouth at a small bay at the very west end of Whitefish Lake. Whitefish Lake in turn empties via the Whitefish Channel into Whitefish Bay on Lac Seul, part of the English River.

Tributaries
Mold Creek (right)

See also
List of rivers of Ontario

References

Rivers of Kenora District
Tributaries of Hudson Bay